Umberto Avattaneo (April 2, 1883 – January 9, 1958) was an Italian track and field athlete who competed in the 1908 Summer Olympics.

Biography
He was born in Rome. In 1908 he finished tenth in the Greek discus throw event. In the discus throw competition his result is unknown.

Achievements

See also
Italy at the 1908 Summer Olympics

References

External links

Report on Italian Olympic athletes 

1883 births
1958 deaths
Italian male discus throwers
Olympic athletes of Italy
Athletes (track and field) at the 1908 Summer Olympics
Athletes from Rome